JLA/Avengers (issues #2 and 4 are titled Avengers/JLA) is a comic book limited series and crossover published in prestige format by DC Comics and Marvel Comics from September 2003 to March 2004. The series was written by Kurt Busiek, with art by George Pérez. The series features the two companies' teams of superheroes, DC Comics' Justice League of America and Marvel's Avengers.

Publication history
In 1979, DC and Marvel agreed to co-publish a crossover series involving the two teams, to be written by Gerry Conway and drawn by George Pérez. The plot of the original crossover was a time travel story involving Marvel's Kang the Conqueror and DC's Lord of Time. Writer/editor Roy Thomas was hired to script the book based on Conway's plot, and although work had begun on the series in 1981 (Pérez had penciled 21 pages by mid-1983) and it was scheduled for publication in May 1983, editorial disputes – reportedly instigated by then-Marvel Editor-in-Chief Jim Shooter – prevented the story from being completed. The failure of the JLA/Avengers book's publication also caused the cancellation of a planned sequel to the 1982 crossover issue The Uncanny X-Men and The New Teen Titans.

An agreement was reached between the two companies in 2002, with a new story to be written by Kurt Busiek and drawn by George Pérez. In a joint panel at WonderCon 2000, Busiek (then writer of the Avengers title) and Mark Waid (the then-writer of the JLA title) stated they had nearly come to an agreement to begin the crossover within the regular issues of the respective titles, but the two companies could not come to a business arrangement. When the series was approved, however, Waid was unavailable due to an exclusive commitment with the company CrossGen, and Busiek became the sole writer on the project. Pérez also had an exclusive commitment with CrossGen, but had a clause written into his contract allowing him to do the series if and when it was approved.

JLA/Avengers is in canon for both companies: the cosmic egg appeared in DC's Trinity and the crossover itself is described in Official Handbook of the Marvel Universe. The series was reprinted by DC Comics in 2004 as a two-volume collector's edition hardcover (which included for the first time the original 21 Pérez-penciled pages from mid-1983), and then re-released as a trade paperback in November 2008. The trade paperback was reprinted in 2022, with 64 pages of extra content, to help Pérez with the medical costs from his cancer treatments.

Plot
Krona, an exiled Oan, travels across the Multiverse and destroys universes seeking the truth of creation. When he arrives in the Marvel Universe, the Grandmaster — wanting to save his universe — proposes that they play a game. If Krona wins, the Grandmaster will lead him to Galactus, a being in that universe who has witnessed creation. If he loses, Krona has to spare the Grandmaster’s universe. Before choosing the players to participate in this game, Krona demands to swap champions, so the Avengers (the Grandmaster’s longtime adversaries) will represent Krona and the Justice League (from Krona's home universe) will fight for the Grandmaster. This means that the Avengers must lose the game in order to save their universe.

The Grandmaster informs the Justice League that to save their universe, they have to gather 12 items of power — six from each universe — while his ally Metron tells the Avengers that they have to do the same to prevent their world from being destroyed. The six items from the DC Universe are the Spear of Destiny; the Book of Eternity; the Orb of Ra; the Medusa Mask; the Bell, Jar and Wheel of the Demons Three; and the Green Lantern Power Battery of Kyle Rayner. The six items from the Marvel Universe are the Ultimate Nullifier; the Evil Eye of Avalon; the Wand of Watoomb; the Casket of Ancient Winters; the Cosmic Cube; and the Infinity Gauntlet.

The Justice League travels to the Marvel Universe and are dismayed (especially Superman) by the Avengers' failure to improve their Earth's condition; for example, the Flash (Wally West) encounters a non-human-looking mutant running away from an anti-mutant mob and the Flash protects him from the mob. Convinced that the Flash is a member of Magneto's Acolytes, the mob attacks him as well. The Flash also discovers that the Speed Force (the source of his powers) does not exist in this universe. When the Avengers visit the DC Universe, they are surprised by the "futuristic" architecture of its Earth's cities and the honors that the Justice League and other native heroes receive for their deeds. As a result, they (mainly Captain America) become convinced that the Justice League are fascists who demand that civilians hero-worship them.

Various Justice League and Avengers members travel across the two universes and fight each other to retrieve the artifacts of power. A final battle for the Cosmic Cube takes place in the Marvel Universe’s Savage Land. After a climactic back-and-forth battle, Quicksilver claims the Cosmic Cube. At that moment, Krona and the Grandmaster arrive on the scene, with the latter observing and commenting that the score is even at 6–6. Batman and Captain America — who together investigated the cause of the contest and discovered its true nature and stakes — arrive. Captain America purposely throws his shield and knocks the Cube from Quicksilver's hands, allowing Batman to catch it. With Captain America's forfeiture of the Cosmic Cube, the Grandmaster now announces the Justice League as the victors, with the final score now being 7–5. Krona is unwilling to accept defeat, and attacks the Grandmaster, forcing the identity of Galactus from him. He then summons Galactus and tries to extract information about the origin of the universe. The Grandmaster uses the power of the artifacts and merges both universes together before Krona can tear Galactus apart.

Reality is altered such that the Justice League and the Avengers are now longtime allies, regularly traveling between worlds to fight various threats. In addition, long-dead JLA members the Flash (Barry Allen) and Green Lantern (Hal Jordan) have reappeared. But the universes are incompatible with one another and begin destroying themselves and each other, with people switching between worlds. One side effect of this is that Superman and Captain America become paranoid, irritable, and short-tempered; their emotions flare to the point where they blame each other for everything that is happening (this is later explained as both heroes being too strongly synchronized to their native universes). The appearance of a spectral Krona helps the heroes remember some of the contest and they find out what is happening to their worlds. The Phantom Stranger appears to lead the heroes to the Grandmaster.

Weakened by Krona's attack, the Grandmaster explains how he brought the universes together to imprison Krona using the 12 items, but Krona is merging the universes further in order to destroy them, hoping to create a new Big Bang, which he can survive and finally learn its mysteries. Before dying, the Grandmaster asks the assembled heroes to stop Krona and restore order. At Captain America's insistence, he reveals various events that had taken place in the separate universes to show the heroes what sorts of worlds they are fighting for. Each team member witnesses the tragedies that had befallen them in their separate universes, such as the death of Barry Allen, Hal Jordan's descent into evil, and the loss of the Vision and the Scarlet Witch's children. Some of the heroes contemplate leaving the universes as they are to prevent the tragedies from happening, but Hal Jordan inspires everyone to work for the good of their worlds.

Krona has trapped the universal avatars of Eternity and Kismet as reality continues to change. He has discovered that a sentience exists in universes and intends to force their spirits out, giving him their secrets. Both teams of heroes reconcile their differences with one another and make plans to stop Krona. Invading Krona's inter-dimensional base, Captain America leads every hero who has ever been a member of the Justice League or the Avengers. Chronal chaos at the base causes an ever-shifting roster of heroes to confront every villain whom the teams have ever fought with the villains having been mentally enthralled by Krona. Even though the chaos and the sheer forces against them (both from Krona and the summoned villains) cause the heroes to fall one by one along the way, Krona is ultimately defeated when the Flash distracts him long enough for Hawkeye to shoot an explosive arrow into the machine he used to keep both worlds merged, after which the Flash takes the items of power — both heroes having been earlier presumed dead in battle. Krona is then sucked into the forming vortex.

The Earths are separated with help from the Spectre (who at this time is Hal Jordan, now restored to his current state) and the universes are returned to their normal states. As the heroes from both universes return to their proper places, they affirm that whether they do too little or too much, they are still heroes who will always fight the good fight. Krona has imploded to form a cosmic egg, which is stored in the JLA Watchtower; Metron states that when the egg hatches, Krona will learn the secrets of its universe's creation by being part of it. Metron and the newly-resurrected Grandmaster discuss how Metron intentionally lured Krona to the Marvel Universe. The Grandmaster says that this is the first game that he has ever played in which all sides won (the Grandmaster by way of the battle between the Justice Leaguers and Avengers, the heroes by saving their universes, and Krona by eventually gaining the answers that he sought).

References

External links 
 
 

Intercompany crossovers
Comics by George Pérez
Comics by Kurt Busiek
Team-up comics
Comics about the end of the universe